Aljazeera Zuwara is a Libyan football club based in Zuwara, Libya.  They play their home games at Zuwara Stadium.

Current squad 
As of 2008–09 season

Aljazeera
1948 establishments in Libya
Association football clubs established in 1948